Man of War (also known as Man O' War) is a  small populated place in Fingal, County Dublin, Ireland. It is centred on the townlands of Courtlough, Malheney and Palmerstown which lie in the civil parish of Balrothery. It is located about 24 kilometres north of Dublin city, between the towns of Skerries, Lusk and Balbriggan.

Man of War is noted for its public house, which has a tree in its centre. The pub has existed for centuries, with deeds mentioning it at least back to 1595.

In 1732 an Act of Parliament established the tolled Coach Road called the Dublin to Dunleer Turnpike (1732—1855) and a turnpike (toll booth) was situated at the Man O'War Pub.

The Gaelic football team of the same name, Man-O-War GFC, was founded in 1946. It fields teams at Juvenile, Adult Mens and Adult Ladies levels. Some notable achievements include winning the 1979 Mens Dublin Junior Championship, as well as the 2019 Ladies Dublin Junior A Championship.

The area around Man O' War gets very busy around the time of the Skerries 100 motorcycle races.

References

Places in Fingal